Colart le Boutellier (fl. 1240–60) was a well-connected trouvère from Arras. There are no references to him independent of his own and others' songs, found in the chansonniers. One of these depicts the known coat-of-arms used by the Boutillier family, one of the petty noble clans of Arras, and assigns it to Colart. Another manuscript does not show any arms for Colart and it can be surmised that he was in fact a member of one of the middle-class families of the same name that could then be found in Arras.

Colart dedicated a song each to Jehan Bretel, Jehan de Nuevile and Phelippot Verdière. Jehan de Nuevile dedicated one to Colart in return. Colart also received dedications from Gillebert de Berneville, Guibert Kaukesel and Henri Amion.  was used as the model for an anonymous song, . His  was a model for another anonymous song, and provided the basis for a contrafactum by the Chastelain de Couci, .

Thirteen songs by Colart are preserved in manuscripts. He preferred isometre, bar form and G modes. He "often drew material from the pedes in the cauda".

Songs
Listed by incipit:

Notes

Trouvères
13th-century French people
Male classical composers